Legacy Recordings is an American record label that is a division of Sony Music. Formed in 1990 after Sony's acquisition of CBS Records, Legacy originally handled the archives of Sony Music-owned labels Columbia Records and Epic Records. In 2004, under the Sony BMG joint venture, the label began to manage the archives of RCA Records, J Records, Windham Hill Records, Arista, LaFace, Jive, and Buddah Records. Legacy Recordings also distributes Philadelphia International Records and the catalog of recordings produced by Phil Spector. It is not related to the defunct British independent label Legacy Records.

Reissues
The Essential series are one- or two-disc compilations of an artist's extensive catalog. On occasion, certain albums in this series would include a limited edition third disc (labeled Essential 3.0), or be revised to include an artist's newer work (for example The Essential Bob Dylan). , several volumes in the Essential series are available on vinyl LP.

Launched in 2009, Playlist is a series of single-disc compilation albums based on artists' best studio work during their time on one of the Sony labels (for example, the Van Morrison Playlist only contains tracks from the BANG Records sessions), serving as a successor to the previous Super Hits series and a less expensive alternative to the Essential series. A spinoff series, Setlist, features compilations of artists' live performances.

The first several albums came in a special eco-packet and to save paper, a PDF file was included on the disc, containing photographs, credits and liner notes. This was met with criticism, because the discs were easily scratched. Later Playlist albums were packaged in standard white jewel cases.

Artists

Jimi Hendrix
Willie Nelson
Prince

See also
 List of record labels
 Lawrence Cohn, previous head of Legacy Recordings
 This Is Jazz (album series)

References

External links
Official Site US
Official Site UK
Company Blog
Podcast Site 

American record labels
Jazz record labels
Reissue record labels
Pop record labels
Record labels established in 1990
Rock record labels
Sony subsidiaries
Sony Music